Klaus Bachlechner (born 27 December 1952) is an Italian former professional footballer who played for Hellas Verona, Pisa (on loan), Novara (on loan), Bologna and Inter Milan. His son Thomas is also a footballer.

External links
Player profile at Inter.it

1952 births
Living people
Sportspeople from Bruneck
Italian footballers
Hellas Verona F.C. players
Pisa S.C. players
Novara F.C. players
Bologna F.C. 1909 players
Inter Milan players
Germanophone Italian people
Serie A players
Serie B players
Association football defenders
Footballers from Trentino-Alto Adige/Südtirol